Sahara is the second studio album by the American rock band House of Lords, released on August 21, 1990.

The album was recorded without original guitarist Lanny Cordola, but with Doug Aldrich as the band's guitarist. Still, the album features many guest contributors on guitar, such as   Rick Nielsen (Cheap Trick), Chris Impellitteri (Impellitteri) and Mandy Meyer (Asia, Krokus). Other contributors on the albums are White Lion's Mike Tramp, Cheap Trick's Robin Zander, Steeler's Ron Keel, Autograph's Steve Plunkett and Giuffria's David Glen Eisley, all on backing vocals.

The album reached position No. 121 in The Billboard 200 chart on February 23, 1991.

"Heart on the Line", which was written by Cheap Trick guitarist Rick Nielsen, would eventually be recorded by Cheap Trick themselves for their 2016 album Bang, Zoom, Crazy... Hello.

Track listing

Personnel
James Christian – lead vocals, additional guitars
Gregg Giuffria – keyboards, backing vocals
Michael Guy – guitars, backing vocals
Chuck Wright – bass, backing vocals
Ken Mary – drums, percussion

Additional musicians
Doug Aldrich – guitars, backing vocals
Rick Nielsen – lead guitar and backing vocals on "Heart on the Line"
Chris Impellitteri – opening guitar solo on "Sahara"
Mandy Meyer – guitar
Mike Tramp – backing vocals
Robin Zander – backing vocals on "Heart on the Line"
David Glen Eisley – backing vocals
Steve Plunkett – backing vocals
Ron Keel – backing vocals
Steve Isham – backing vocals
S.S. Priest – backing vocals
Billy Dior – backing vocals
Robbie Snow – backing vocals
Cheri Martin – backing vocals
Melony Barnet – backing vocals
Bruce Flohr – backing vocals
David Sluts – backing vocals
Shannon Wolak – backing vocals
Margie Rist – backing vocals
Erin Perry – backing vocals
Kimberly Gold – backing vocals
Aina Olson – backing vocals
Breta Troyer – backing vocals

References

External links
Kiss-Related-Recordings
Sleaze Roxx

1990 albums
House of Lords (band) albums
Albums produced by Andy Johns
Albums produced by Gene Simmons